Kolleen Casey Shields (born 1959 in St. Paul, Minnesota) was a gymnast who competed for the United States in the 1976 Montreal Olympics.  She finished  23rd 
in the vault, an event won by Nadia Comăneci.  She was the 1975 U.S. national champion in vault.  Shields competed for Southwest Missouri State University from 1977 to 1979, where she won the Honda Sports Award as the nation's top female gymnast in 1979.  She transferred to the University of Minnesota, graduating with a degree in Physical Therapy.  Shields became a physical therapist at
the University of Iowa.

References

External links
"Injuries in women's gymnastics", The American Journal of Sports Medicine 15:558-565 (1987) (coauthor)

1959 births
Living people
University of Minnesota Medical School alumni
American female artistic gymnasts
Gymnasts at the 1976 Summer Olympics
Olympic gymnasts of the United States
Pan American Games medalists in gymnastics
Pan American Games gold medalists for the United States
Pan American Games silver medalists for the United States
Pan American Games bronze medalists for the United States
Gymnasts at the 1975 Pan American Games
21st-century American women
20th-century American women